The ocellated velvet gecko, ocellated gecko,  or blotched gecko (Oedura monilis) is a gecko endemic to Queensland and New South Wales in Australia.

References

Oedura
Reptiles described in 1888
Taxa named by Charles Walter De Vis
Geckos of Australia